The Admiralty Central Metallurgical Laboratory was a specialist research unit of the British Royal Navy from 1936 to 1956.

History
The Central Metallurgical Laboratory was based at Emsworth in England. The organization was a specialist research unit as part of the Portsmouth Dockyard's engineering department. In 1956 the unit was closed and its staff and work was divided between two other Admiralty organizations the Materials Laboratory and Chemical Department.

See also
 Admiralty

References

Sources
Archives, The National. "Admiralty: Central Metallurgical Laboratory: Reports and Papers". discovery.nationalarchives.gov.uk. National Archives UK, ADM 254, 1943-1956.

External links
http://www.nationalarchives.gov.uk/doc/open-government-licence/version/3/

Admiralty departments
Admiralty during World War II
1936 establishments in the United Kingdom
1956 disestablishments in the United Kingdom